Vijitapura  is a town situated near Ratnapura in Sri Lanka and  from Colombo Vijitapura is between Batticaloa and Badulla and Galle, behind this area of "We" river, which is heading to "Kauu River".

Gem trade
Vijitapura is known for its gemstone trading and attracts tourists and gem buyers from the local area and international specialty buyers from Thailand. The main income of this economic area is the gem market and gem-related business since its earliest years.

Municipal structure
The Vijitapura Urban Development Council was created in the 1940s. It was succeeded by the Vijitapura Urban Council.

See also
Balangoda Man

Populated places in Ratnapura District